This is a list of sporting events in Sweden that are held on an annual basis.

Open to everyone
Alliansloppet - 16, 32 & 48km roller skiing event in Trollhättan World biggest rollerski race
Broloppet - Swedish/Danish road running (half marathon) event across the Oresund Bridge
Convinistafetten - A relay race for corporate teams around Laduviken 
Engelbrektsloppet - 60 km cross-country skiing event in Västmanland
Gothia Cup - youth football tournament in Gothenburg
Gotland runt - sailing event around the island of Gotland
Göteborgsvarvet - road running (half marathon) event in Gothenburg
Lidingöloppet - 30 km cross country running event in Lidingö
O-Ringen - multiday orienteering race
Partille Cup - youth handball tournament in Gothenburg
Stockholm Marathon - marathon in Stockholm
Tiomila - An orienteering relay event
Tjejmilen - 10 km cross country running event for women in Djurgården, open for girls and women only
Tjejtrampet - 45 km road bicycle racing event for women in northern Stockholm, open for girls and women only
Tjejvasan - 10 km cross country skiing event for women in Dalarna, open for girls and women only
Vansbrosimningen - 3 km swimming event in Vansbro
Vasaloppet - 90 km cross-country skiing event in Dalarna, from Sälen to Mora
Vikingarännet - 80 km ice skating event on Mälaren between Uppsala and Stockholm
Vätternrundan - 300 km cycling event, around the lake Vättern
Ö till ö - a run-, cycle- and swim event in the archipelago of Stockholm.

Open to elite only
DN Galan — athletics event at Stockholms Olympiastadion
Finland-Sweden athletics international (Finnkampen) - athletics competition between Sweden and Finland, alternatingly held in Sweden and Finland
Nordea Nordic Light Open - tennis tournament held in Stockholm
Open de Suède Vårgårda - women's road bicycle racing event held in Vårgårda
Scandinavian Masters - golf tournament on the European Tour
speedway events, part of the Speedway Grand Prix Series:
Speedway Grand Prix of Sweden (since 1995)
Speedway Grand Prix of Scandinavia (since 2002)
LG Hockey Games
Swedish Open — tennis competition in Båstad
Swedish Open Championships - annual table tennis tournament
Swedish Rally — rally in Värmland
Swedish Short Course Swimming Championships
Swedish Swimming Championships

National leagues, cups and tours
Allsvenskan — the top-level men's football league
Damallsvenskan — the top-level women's football league
Swedish Hockey League — the top-level ice hockey league
Elitserien — the top-level bandy league
Elitserien — the top-level baseball league
Elitserien — the top-level men's handball league
Elitserien — the top-level women's handball league
Elitserien — the top-level speedway league
Svenska Basketligan - the top-level men's basketball league
Basketligan Dam - the top-level women's basketball league
Svenska Cupen - the main Swedish football cup
Swedish Golf Tour - the domestic professional golf tour
Swedish Super League — the top-level men's floorball league
Swedish Super League — the top-level women's floorball league
Swedish Touring Car Championship

See also
Sport in Sweden

Sweden
Events
Sporting